The following is a list of awards and nominations received by American actor Chris Pine throughout his career.

Awards and nominations

Notes

References

Pine, Chris